Wiki surveys or wikisurveys are a software-based survey method with similarity to how wikis evolve through crowdsourcing. In essence, they are surveys that allow participants to create the questions that are being asked. As participants engage in the survey they can either vote on a survey question or create a survey question. A single open-ended prompt written by the creator of the survey determines the topic the questions should be on. The first known implementation of a wiki survey was in 2010, and they have been used since then for a variety of purposes such as facilitating deliberative democracy, crowdsourcing opinions from experts and figuring out common beliefs on a given topic. A notable usage of wiki surveys is in Taiwan's government system, where citizens can participate in crowdsourced lawmaking through Polis wiki surveys.

Wiki surveys facilitate collective intelligence by allowing users to both contribute and respond to the survey, as well as see the results of the survey in real time. They can be seen in a more general sense as a tool for establishing consensus in large volumes of people. Wiki surveys mainly differ from consensus-building in comment sections by using a heuristic which determines the order of questions for each participant that aims to maximize consensus, not allowing replies to questions and providing visualization tools to better understand consensus.

Implementations

All Our Ideas 

All Our Ideas was the first ever wiki survey. Its focus is on ranking the favorability of each 'item' that users submit to the survey. Each question presented asks the participant to rank the best of two items. At any point in time, participants can view a ranking of the items in order of their score. The score for an item is the estimated probability that it would be favored over another randomly chosen item. In this sense, it is considered a 'pairwise wiki survey'. The code for All Our Ideas is open source.

Polis 
Polis (also known as Pol.is) was developed in 2012. The focus of Polis is to project participants into an 'opinion space' where they can see how their voting behavior compares to other participants. The opinion space clusters participants into groups of similar opinion and is designed in a way to avoid tyranny of the majority by being able to include groups that have small numbers of participants. The questions participants are presented with are a simple agree/disagree/pass on a single 'comment' submitted by a participant. The code for Polis is open source.

Examples 

 PlaNYC used All Our Ideas to gather ideas on how to establish New York City's sustainability plan
 vTaiwan, a citizen-lead government process in Taiwan, uses Polis for enabling large amounts of citizens to deliberate and consequently provide input on Taiwan's legislative decisions
 OECD used All Our Ideas to gather ideas from the public prior to meeting for a forum and meeting on which skills are most important to invest in for the 21st century
 March On, an offshoot of the Women's March Movement, used Polis to understand the opinions of people wanting to support the movement
 AARP used All Our Ideas to better understand the concerns its members have about acquiring and using big data regarding people's health and wellness
 Bowling Green used Polis to host a virtual town hall for its residents to better inform its community leaders on how to improve the quality of life of its residents
 Residents of Harrogate use Polis to debate issues in their community, with the results being released publicly to everyone

Characteristics 
Wiki surveys have the following three defining characteristics:

Collaborativeness 
Wiki surveys allow participants to contribute questions, as well as answer questions created by its participants.

Adaptivity 
Wiki surveys adapt to elicit the most useful information from its participants. This is done by changing the ordering of questions based on the voting behavior of previous participants so as to maximize consensus. The heuristic determining the ordering of questions highly values showing the comments that have been voted on the least.

Greediness 
Although being greedy typically has a negative connotation, it is used in a positive manner for wiki surveys. They are 'greedy' because they make full use of information that participants are willing to provide. Wiki surveys do not require participants to answer a fixed amount of questions, participants can answer as little or as much as they want.

Traditional survey methods vs. wiki surveys

Advantages of wiki surveys 
Questions in traditional survey methods fall into two categories: Open and closed questions. Open questions ask the person taking the survey to write an open response while closed questions give a fixed set of responses to select from. Wiki surveys are like a hybrid of the two, enabling insightful consensus in certain situations where traditional survey methods may lack. Closed questions are easy to analyze quantitively, but the limited options to select from for a given question may cause bias. Open questions are not as subject to bias, but are difficult to analyze quantitatively at scale. Wiki surveys allow for open responses by the users' contribution of survey questions (also called 'items'), and uses machine learning techniques to automatically quantitative analyze the responses to those questions.

The 'greediness' characteristic of wiki surveys is thought to also be advantageous, as it allows for gathering more data per participant. Data from real-world usage of wiki surveys shows that there are a relatively small amount of participants that answer a relatively large amount of questions compared to most participants. In traditional surveys, participants who want to provide more information than required are typically not allowed to do so, thus missing out on potentially useful information.

Disadvantages of wiki surveys 
Traditional survey methods are better suited for situations where the survey creator(s) need to acquire consensus on a specific question or set of questions. Wiki surveys are more seen as a method for deliberation and gathering consensus on ideas that were not thought of by the survey creator(s). There is also a lack of research on determining potential biases that wiki surveys may cause.

References 

Survey methodology
Wikis